This list of films made by Continental-Kunstfilm GmbH is incomplete. The majority of films in this list are considered lost.

The list is sorted by date, then by film title. The dates shown (where known) may include: Berlin police censor (Zensur), Registering (Prüfung), copyright (UK or US), and first performance.

See also 
List of film production companies

References 
 Notes

 Citations

 Sources
 
 

Continental-Kunstfilm
Continental